The Mansholt Commission is the European Commission that held office from 22 March 1972 to 5 January 1973. Its President was Sicco Mansholt.

Work 
It was the successor to the Malfatti Commission and was succeeded by the Ortoli Commission.  It oversaw the creation of the European Monetary System on 24 April 1972 and the first enlargement on 1 January 1973.

Membership

Summary by political leanings 
The colour of the row indicates the approximate political leaning of the office holder using the following scheme:

References

External links 
 European Commission Website

 
European Commissions